Sand Island is an island in Grays Harbor, in the U.S. state of Washington. The entire island is occupied by Sand Island Natural Area Preserve, a protected area under the State Department of Natural Resources' Washington Natural Areas Program. The small sandy island is seasonally overtopped by the salt waters of the harbor.

References

Uninhabited islands of Washington (state)
Landforms of Grays Harbor County, Washington
Washington Natural Areas Program